Poranopsis is a genus of flowering plants belonging to the family Convolvulaceae.

Its native range is Indian subcontinent to Southern Central China and Indo-China.

Species:

Poranopsis discifera 
Poranopsis paniculata 
Poranopsis sinensis

References

Convolvulaceae
Convolvulaceae genera